Birdsong is an English surname.  Notable people with the surname include:

 Bob Birdsong (born 1948), American bodybuilder
 Carl Birdsong (born 1959), American football player
 Cindy Birdsong (born 1939), American singer
 Edwin Birdsong (1941–2019), American organist
 Gary Birdsong, American fundamentalist preacher
 Keith Birdsong (1959–2019), Native American illustrator
 Larry Birdsong (1934–1990), American R&B singer 
 Mary Birdsong (born 1968), American actress
 Mia Birdsong, American activist
 Otis Birdsong (born 1955), American basketball player

See also
 Ricky Byrdsong (1956–1999), American college basketball coach and murder victim
 Birdsong (disambiguation)

English-language surnames